Yoon Kyung-Min (born 31 October 1979) is a Korean handball player who competed in the 2000 Summer Olympics, the 2004 Summer Olympics, the 2007 World Championship, and in the 2008 Summer Olympics. He is a younger brother of Yoon Kyung-shin.

References

1979 births
Living people
South Korean male handball players
Olympic handball players of South Korea
Handball players at the 2000 Summer Olympics
Handball players at the 2004 Summer Olympics
Handball players at the 2008 Summer Olympics
Asian Games medalists in handball
Handball players at the 1998 Asian Games
Handball players at the 2002 Asian Games
Asian Games gold medalists for South Korea
Medalists at the 1998 Asian Games
Medalists at the 2002 Asian Games
21st-century South Korean people